The Knuckleball Suite is the seventh album by American singer/songwriter Peter Mulvey. Produced in 2006 by David Goodrich and released by Signature Sounds, it contains a cover of the U2 song "The Fly".

Reception

Allmusic wrote of the album "his eclectic musical approach is immediately apparent on this ambitious collection of songs."

Track listing
All songs by Peter Mulvey unless otherwise noted.
"Old Simon Stimson" – 2:52
"Abilene (The Eisenhower Waltz)" – 3:23
"The Fly" (Bono, U2) – 3:58
"Girl in the Hi-Tops" – 2:46
"You and Me and the Ten Thousand Things" – 3:47
"Horses" – 3:11
"Thorn" – 3:44
"Lila Blue" (Mulvey, David Goodrich, Tim Gearan) – 3:13
"Marty and Lou" – 2:!6
"Brady Street Stroll" (Mulvey, Paul Cebar) – 3:34
"The Knuckleball Suite" – 3:42
"The Fix is On" (Mulvey, Goodrich) – 4:51
"Coda: Ballymore" – 1:31

Personnel
Peter Mulvey – vocals, acoustic guitar
Kris Delmhorst – fiddle, vocals
David "Goody" Goodrich – banjo, guitar
Mike Piehl – drums
Sean Staples – banjo, vocals
Louise Ulrich – bass

Production notes
David "Goody" Goodrich – producer, mixing
Mark Thayer – engineer, mixing
Ian Kennedy – mastering
Amy Ruppel – design

References

Peter Mulvey albums
2006 albums